Prairie Spirit Trail State Park is a rail trail that is a Kansas State Park.

The trail is built on the former right of way of the Leavenworth, Lawrence and Galveston Railroad from Ottawa, Kansas, to Iola, Kansas.  The trail runs 50 miles from its northern terminus at Ottawa, Kansas to its southern terminus at Iola, Kansas.

The trail is open for use by hikers, joggers, and bicyclists year-round, from sunrise to sunset. This trail is paved with a hard-packed limestone screening outside of the city limits of Ottawa, Garnett, and Iola. Inside Ottawa, Garnett, and Iola, the trail is paved with asphalt.  A Kansas State Park vehicle permit is not required, but a separate trail permit (daily/annual) must be purchased for those using the trail outside the city limits of Ottawa, Garnett, and Iola.

During flooding in June 2007, a section of the bridge carrying the trail over Pottawatomie Creek north of Garnett washed out. The bridge has since been replaced.

Trail Route
The Museum and terminus of the trail is located just north of the Marais Des Cygnes River in downtown Ottawa. From Ottawa, the trail heads south and detours from the right of way to cross under Interstate 35 at its intersection with US Highway 59.

Continuing to the south from Ottawa, the trail hits two small railroad towns, Princeton and Richmond.  Garnett, located about midway on the  right of way between Ottawa and Iola features a restored Santa Fe depot which is used as the city's trailhead.  The depot serves as a rest stop for trail users, as well as an information center for the city.

Phase 3 of the trail spans from Welda, Kansas, to Iola, Kansas, passing the small towns of  Colony and Carlyle. Colony and Iola trailheads feature both restrooms and water, while the Carlyle trailhead has only a single restroom without water.

Future Expansion
The trail has been developed southward from the Iola trailhead to the town of Humboldt, about nine miles, led through the efforts of Thrive Allen County, a community organization, and the Allen County local government. This extension is named the Southwind Rail-Trail, and opened to the public on June 10, 2013.  Future aspirations of the trail include intersecting the future Flint Hills Nature Trail, a  trail currently under construction connecting Herington, Kansas, to the west, and Osawatomie, Kansas, to the east, in Ottawa.  The eastern section from Ottawa to Osawatomie is completed.  This trail is also part of the ambitious Quad-State Trail project which will connect trails together in Nebraska, Kansas, Missouri, and Iowa. The project also includes the Katy Trail State Park in Missouri.

Management
The park is routinely patrolled by staff of the Kansas Department of Wildlife, Parks and Tourism and other law-enforcement agencies. Only non-motorized vehicles, and motorized wheelchairs, are allowed. A daily-use per-person permit is $3.50, and may be purchased at self-pay stations located at the Ottawa, Princeton, Richmond, Garnett, Welda, Carlyle, and Iola trail heads. Annual-use per-person permits are $12.50 and may be bought at sites in Ottawa, Garnett, and Iola. No permit is required for those age 15 or younger, or for use within the cities of Ottawa, Iola and Garnett.

References

External links

Friends of the Prairie Spirit Trail

Prairie Spirit Trail at Singletracks.com
Prairie Spirit Rail Trail at MTB Project
Prairie Spirit Trail State Park at TrailLink.com
Prairie Spirit Trail at TrailForks.com

Protected areas of Allen County, Kansas
Protected areas of Anderson County, Kansas
Protected areas of Franklin County, Kansas
State parks of Kansas
Rail trails in Kansas